Eau Claire County is a county located in the U.S. state of Wisconsin. As of the 2020 census, the population was 105,710. Its county seat is Eau Claire. The county took its name from the Eau Claire River.

Eau Claire County is included in the Eau Claire, WI Metropolitan Statistical Area as well as the Eau Claire-Menomonie WI Combined Statistical Area.

History
Eau Claire county was originally set off as the Town of Clearwater in Chippewa County in 1855. The name was changed to the Town of Eau Claire on March 31, 1856. The entire town was separated as Eau Claire County by an act of the Wisconsin State Legislature on October 6, 1856.

Geography

Adjacent counties
 Chippewa County – north
 Clark County – east
 Jackson County – southeast
 Trempealeau County – south
 Buffalo County – southwest
 Pepin County – west
 Dunn County – west

Demographics and religion statistics

2020 census
As of the census of 2020, the population was 105,710. The racial makeup of the county was 88.2% White, 4.2% Asian, 1.2% Black or African American, 0.5% Native American, 0.1% Pacific Islander, 1.1% from other races, and 4.7% from two or more races. Ethnically, the population was 2.9% Hispanic or Latino of any race.

2000 census
As of the census of 2000, there were 93,142 people, 35,822 households, and 22,281 families residing in the county. There were 37,474 housing units at an average density of 59 per square mile (23/km2). The racial makeup of the county was 94.96% White, 0.52% Black or African American, 0.54% Native American, 2.52% Asian, 0.03% Pacific Islander, 0.33% from other races, and 1.11% from two or more races. 0.94% of the population were Hispanic or Latino of any race. 37.4% were of German, 21.5% Norwegian and 7.0% Irish ancestry. 94.2% spoke English, 1.6% Hmong, 1.6% Spanish and 1.0% German as their first language.

There were 35,822 households, out of which 30.00% had children under the age of 18 living with them, 50.60% were married couples living together, 8.60% had a female householder with no husband present, and 37.80% were non-families. 27.10% of all households were made up of individuals, and 10.10% had someone living alone who was 65 years of age or older. The average household size was 2.46 and the average family size was 3.02.

In the county, the population was spread out, with 23.40% under the age of 18, 17.10% from 18 to 24, 26.70% from 25 to 44, 20.50% from 45 to 64, and 12.20% who were 65 years of age or older. The median age was 32 years. For every 100 females, there were 93.80 males. For every 100 females age 18 and over, there were 90.60 males.

In 2017, there were 1,191 births, giving a general fertility rate of 52.8 births per 1000 women aged 15–44, the tenth lowest rate out of all 72 Wisconsin counties. Of these, 99 of the births occurred at home, the third highest for Wisconsin counties.

In 2010, the largest religious groups by reported number of adherents were Catholic at 16,240 adherents, ELCA Lutheran at 15,067 adherents, Missouri Synod Lutheran at 6,953 adherents, LCMC Lutheran at 3,355 adherents, United Methodist at 2,177 adherents, non-denominational Christian at 1,557 adherents, Lutheran Brethren at 1,391 adherents, United Church of Christ at 1,046 adherents, Assemblies of God at 969 adherents, Amish at 794 adherents, Wisconsin Synod Lutheran at 757 adherents, ELS Lutheran at 708 adherents, and LDS (Mormon) at 703 adherents.

Transportation

Major highways

Railroads
Union Pacific

Buses
Eau Claire Transit
List of intercity bus stops in Wisconsin

Airport
Eau Claire county is served by the Chippewa Valley Regional Airport (KEAU).

Government

The legislative body of Eau Claire County is the non-partisan 29-member Eau Claire County Board of Supervisors. Members of the board of supervisors are elected by district and the chairperson and vice-chair positions are elected from within members of the board.

The board meets in the Eau Claire County Courthouse in downtown Eau Claire, with its weekly meetings televised on local public television and transcripts published online. Most items are approved on a "consent calendar" without discussion. Public comment is limited to three minutes per individual per item.

Eau Claire County contains portions of the Wisconsin State Senate districts 23 and 31, represented by Kathy Bernier (R) and Jeff Smith (D) respectively. It also contains portions of Wisconsin State Assembly districts 68 (Jesse James [R]) and 93 (Warren Petryk [R]), as well as almost all of district 91 (Jodi Emerson [D]). At the federal level, the entire county is contained within Wisconsin's third congressional district, which is represented in the United States House of Representatives by Ron Kind (D). At the Presidential level Eau Claire is solidly Democratic, having last voted Republican in 1984 for Ronald Reagan in his landslide re-election. Since 1984 the closest a Republican has come to winning Eau Claire was in 2000 when George W. Bush lost the county by 6.6 percent.

Recreation
Attractions include the Chippewa Valley Museum in Eau Claire, Dells Mill Museum in Augusta, Dells Mill Water Powered Museum in Augusta, the Paul Bunyan Logging Camp in Eau Claire, and the Sarge Boyd Bandshell in Eau Claire.

Communities

Cities
 Altoona
 Augusta
 Eau Claire (county seat; partly in Chippewa County)

Villages
 Fairchild
 Fall Creek

Towns

 Bridge Creek
 Brunswick
 Clear Creek
 Drammen
 Fairchild
 Lincoln
 Ludington
 Otter Creek
 Pleasant Valley
 Seymour
 Union
 Washington
 Wilson

Census-designated places
 Seymour

Unincorporated communities

 Allen
 Brackett
 Candy Corners
 Cleghorn
 Foster
 Hale Corner
 Hay Creek
 Ludington
 Lufkin
 Mount Hope Corners
 Rodell
 Truax
 Union
 Wilson

Ghost towns/neighborhoods
 Hadleyville‡
 Nelsonville‡
 Oak Grove‡
 Porter's Mills‡
 Shawtown§

Footnotes
‡ Historical community
§ Now part of the City of Eau Claire

See also
 National Register of Historic Places listings in Eau Claire County, Wisconsin

References

Further reading
 Bailey, William F. (ed.). History of Eau Claire County, Wisconsin, Past and Present. Chicago: C. F. Cooper, 1914.

External links

 
 Eau Claire County map from the Wisconsin Department of Transportation
 History of Eau Claire County
 University of Wisconsin-Eau Claire, Special Collections and Archives
 Chippewa Valley Museum

 
1856 establishments in Wisconsin
Populated places established in 1856
Eau Claire–Chippewa Falls metropolitan area